H. flavus  may refer to:
 Haplochromis flavus, a fish species endemic to Tanzania
 Helius flavus, a species of fly in the family Limoniidae
 Hemignathus flavus, the oʻahu ʻamakihi, a bird species found in Hawaii
 Hyalobagrus flavus, a catfish species

See also
 Flavus (disambiguation)